The Eswatini Olympic and Commonwealth Games Association (EOCGA), previously the Swaziland Olympic and Commonwealth Games Association, (IOC code: SWZ) is the National Olympic Committee representing Eswatini. It was created in 1968 and officially recognised by the International Olympic Committee in 1972.  Following the country's name change in April 2018, the Swaziland Olympic and Commonwealth Games Association changed its name to the Eswatini Olympic and Commonwealth Games Association.

Presidents
 Zombodze Magagula: 2013–2017
 Peter Shongwe: 2017–present

See also
 Eswatini at the Olympics
 Eswatini at the Commonwealth Games

References

External links
 The EOCGA official website

Eswatini
Eswatini
Eswatini at the Olympics
Association
Olympic
1968 establishments in Swaziland
Sports organizations established in 1968